Barry "The Fish" Melton (born June 14, 1947) is the co-founder and original lead guitarist of Country Joe and the Fish and Dinosaurs. He appears on all the Country Joe and the Fish recordings and he also wrote some of the songs that the band recorded. He appeared in the films made at Monterey Pop and Woodstock, and also appeared as an outlaw in the neo-Western film, Zachariah, and other films in which Country Joe and the Fish appear. An attorney and member of the State Bar of California, Melton has maintained a criminal defense practice since 1982.

Life and career
Melton was born in Brooklyn, New York, United States, the son of secretary Taube "Tillie" ( Kuchuck) and James Melton, an HVAC engineer who taught at Los Angeles City College. His mother was from an East Coast Jewish family (her parents were from Odessa) and his father was from a Texas pioneer family and shares ancestry in colonial Virginia with George Washington, as well as deep roots in Ireland.

Raised in Brooklyn's Brighton Beach neighborhood and the San Fernando Valley of Los Angeles, California, Melton served as a Congress of Racial Equality volunteer during Freedom Summer and participated in a demonstration against Trần Lệ Xuân during her September–October 1963 lecture tour of Europe and the United States. Having previously studied under Kay Kyser guitarist Milton Norman for much of his youth at the instigation of his parents, Melton initially befriended future bandmate Bruce Barthol in his high school's folk music club. After ascending to the presidency of that organization, Melton became ensconced in the American folk music revival in earnest, playing at such venues as the Ash Grove. A summer 1964 hitchhiking excursion to the San Francisco Bay Area and his hometown of New York City yielded his first introduction to Joe McDonald at a Malvina Reynolds concert in the Bay Area.

Upon graduating early from Ulysses S. Grant High School in January 1965, Melton enrolled at San Francisco State University after becoming a devotee of faculty member S. I. Hayakawa's writings on general semantics. Dissuaded by the fact that Hayakawa only taught upper-division courses and "lured away by the music", he dropped out after ten weeks, reuniting with McDonald in nearby Berkeley, California; paralleling the development of such contemporaneous groups as the Grateful Dead, various duo and jug band-oriented permutations of their act (centered on the Jabberwock, a Berkeley coffeehouse) would ultimately evolve into Country Joe and the Fish by early 1966.

With a desire to eschew the rigors of a touring lifestyle, while maintaining his countercultural values following the birth of his first son in 1977, he enrolled in the law program at La Salle Extension University, a now-defunct correspondence law school. After earning his Juris Doctor from Ocean University (a similar institution) and passing the California bar exam in 1982, Melton maintained a private criminal defense practice in San Francisco for twelve years before becoming a deputy public defender in Mendocino County, California, in 1994. Following a brief tenure as a California deputy state public defender from 1998 to 1999, he took a position with Yolo County, California, eventually retiring in 2009 as the county's chief public defender. Since then, he has resumed private practice and worked as a subcontractor for Lake Defense, the contract provider of indigent defense services in Lake County, California. He is certified as a specialist in criminal law by the State Bar of California Board of Legal Specialization.

Melton also continues to be active in music. Since 2001, he has performed in Italy, England, France, Thailand and Russia (including a performance with the Russian band Crossroadz in Moscow). He often appears with his own band, mainly around northern California, and generally tours Europe briefly in the summer. Peter Albin of Big Brother and the Holding Company has continued to play with Melton for over 40 years.

Discography

Studio Albums 
Bright Sun Is Shining (Vanguard, 1970)
The Fish (United Artists Records, 1975)
We Are Like the Ocean (Music Is Medicine, 1977)
Level with Me (Music Is Medicine, 1978)
Songs of the Next Great Depression (Rag Baby Records, 1981)

Collaborative Albums 
Melton, Levy & The Dey Bros. (Columbia, 1972)
Duel in the Desert with Rich Hopkins (Taxim Records, 2007)

As band member 
With Dinosaurs
Dinousaurs (Relix Records, 1988)
Friends of Extinction (Retroworld, 2004) (Compilation Album)

With Jamasutra
Revolution Down the Road (2010)

With Can't Stop to Boogie
Can't Stop to Boogie (2011)

As guest 

With Otis Spann
Cryin' Time (1969, Vanguard)

References

External links
 Barry "The Fish" Melton homepage
 Law Office of Barry Melton (website)
 CJFishlegacy.com
 2011 interview with Barry Melton on Prog Sphere
 October 2011 KDRT radio interview leading up to Davis benefit concert

1947 births
Living people
Guitarists from California
Musicians from Brooklyn
La Salle Extension University alumni
American anti–Vietnam War activists
American rock guitarists
American male guitarists
Country Joe and the Fish members
Public defenders
Activists from New York (state)
Activists from California
20th-century American guitarists
Grant High School (Los Angeles) alumni
People from Brighton Beach
20th-century American male musicians
The Dinosaurs members